Worldwide, hundreds of thousands of sea turtles a year are accidentally caught in shrimp trawl nets, on longline hooks and in fishing gill-nets. Sea turtles need to reach the surface to breathe, and therefore many drown once caught. Loggerhead and hawksbill turtles are particularly vulnerable. Nearly all species of sea turtle are classified as Endangered. They are killed for their eggs, meat, skin and shells. They also face habitat destruction. Climate change has an impact on turtle nesting sites. As fishing activity expands, this threat is more of a problem.

Endangered Species Act 
The Endangered Species Act of 1973 (ESA; 16 U.S.C. § 1531 et seq.) is one of the dozens of US environmental laws passed in the 1970s, and serves as the enacting legislation to carry out the provisions outlined in The Convention on International Trade in Endangered Species of Wild Fauna and Flora (CITES). Designed to protect critically imperiled species from extinction, it was signed into law by President Richard Nixon on December 28, 1973. The U.S. Supreme Court found that "the plain intent of Congress in enacting" the ESA "was to halt and reverse the trend toward species extinction, whatever the cost." The Act is administered by two federal agencies, the United States Fish and Wildlife Service (FWS) and the National Oceanic and Atmospheric Administration (NOAA).

Endangered marine turtles 

Hawksbill turtles are characterized by a pointed beak that resembles that of a bird's. Typically, the turtles can have a shell length up to about 45 inches, and weigh around 150 pounds. The upper shell, also known as a carapace, is serrated with thick, overlapping plates. The elaborate patterned shells make them valuable in global trading markets. Located predominantly around tropical coral reefs, Hawksbills feed on small reef species such as sea sponges, anemones and jellyfish using their narrow beaks to reach crevices in the reef.

The green turtle, named for its green, fatty underside and cartilage, are significantly larger than the Hawksbill and can be recognized by a single pair of prefrontal scales . Green turtles average 3-4 feet in carapace length, and weigh between 240 and 420 pounds once fully grown. The diet of green turtles ranges throughout their lifetime, from small crustaceans and aquatic insects at a young age, to mainly sea grasses and algae as an adult. The turtles inhabit coastlines around islands and protected shores in both tropical and temperate climates.

Loggerhead turtles are named for their large heads that support powerful jaw muscles, allowing them to crush hard-shelled prey like clams and sea urchins. They are less likely to be hunted for their meat or shell compared to other sea turtles. Bycatch, the accidental capture of marine animals in fishing gear, is a serious problem for loggerhead turtles because they frequently come in contact with fisheries.

Threats 
Worldwide, hundreds of thousands of sea turtles a year are accidentally caught in shrimp trawl nets, on longline hooks and in fishing gillnets—a threat known as bycatch. Sea turtles need to reach the surface to breathe, and therefore many drown once caught. Loggerheads are highly migratory and are very likely to come in contact with a fishery, particularly in shrimp gill nets and long lines. [2]

Climate change, also called global warming, refers to the rise in average surface temperatures on Earth. An overwhelming scientific consensus maintains that climate change is due primarily to the human use of fossil fuels, which releases carbon dioxide and other greenhouse gases into the air. The gases trap heat within the atmosphere, which can have a range of effects on ecosystems, including rising sea levels, severe weather events, and droughts that render landscapes more susceptible to wildfires.

Overfishing
Human activities have tipped the scales against the survival of these ancient mariners. Nearly all species of sea turtle are classified as Endangered. Slaughtered for their eggs, meat, skin, and shells, sea turtles suffer from poaching and over-exploitation. They also face habitat destruction and accidental capture in fishing gear. Climate change has an impact on turtle nesting sites. It alters sand temperatures, which then affects the sex of hatchlings.

Hawksbills are particularly vulnerable to bycatch, this is a serious threat to hawksbill turtles. As fishing activity expands, this threat is more of a problem.

References

Endangered species
Sea turtles
Turtle conservation
.